Elvijs Misāns (born 8 April 1989 in Sigulda) is a Latvian athlete usually competing in long jump and triple jump. His personal bests are 8.08 metres in long jump and 17.02 metres in triple jump.

International competitions

1No mark in the final

Personal bests

References

1989 births
Living people
Latvian male long jumpers
Latvian male triple jumpers
Latvian male sprinters
People from Sigulda
European Games competitors for Latvia
Athletes (track and field) at the 2019 European Games